Fremont (also known as Elkhorn) is an unincorporated community in Yolo County, California. It is located on the Sacramento River and Interstate 5 in the east-northeastern portion of the county. Fremont's ZIP Code is 95691 and its area code 530.

Recently the Yolo County Board of Supervisors proposed an Elkhorn Specific Plan for the area to be developed as the "Gateway to Yolo". The county plans for 322 of the total acreage to be job producing, with an estimated 5,846 jobs opened. The City of Woodland has expressed discontent with the idea of developing the rural area, primarily because it could detract revenue from hoteliers in Woodland as people from the Sacramento International Airport might choose Elkhorn as their destination for a hotel rather than Woodland.

References

External links

Unincorporated communities in California
Unincorporated communities in Yolo County, California